Yuán Kèdìng (Chinese: 袁克定; 1878–1958), courtesy name Yuntai (云台), was the eldest son of Yuan Shikai. His mother was Yuan's first wife, Yu (于氏), and Yuan Kewen was his younger brother.

In his childhood, Yuan followed his father to many places when he served in various positions in the Qing dynasty. He studied in Germany and spoke fluent German and English. At the end of the Qing dynasty, he served as a low-ranking official in the government. After the Xinhai Revolution, under the instruction of his father, Yuan became a close friend of Wang Jingwei. According to the History of Xinhai Revolution, Yuan and Wang swore to be "brothers of different surnames" in front of Yuan Shikai.

In 1915 when his father Yuan Shikai proclaimed himself Hóngxiàn Emperor of the Empire of China, Yuan became crown prince as the Prince Yuntai.

After the death of his father, Yuan lived reclusively in the German concession in Tianjin. In 1935, he moved to Baochao Lane (宝钞胡同) in Beijing. In 1937, he again relocated to Qinghuaxuan Villa in the Summer Palace. During the Sino-Japanese War, after the fall of Northern China, the Japanese army officer Kenji Doihara asked Yuan to join the Japanese puppet regimes, hoping to use his identity to exert some influence on the old Beiyang Ministry. Yuan refused to cooperate with the Imperial Japanese Army, as he did not wish to be seen as a traitor and his life became impoverished.

In 1948, due to poverty, Yuan turned to his cousin, Zhang Boju (张伯驹), and moved into Tsinghua Garden at Tsinghua University. Thanks to the help of Zhang Shizhao, after 1949, Yuan became a fellow of the Central Research Institute of Culture and History, and thus had a steady income.

Personal life 
Yuan had three children. His son, Yuan Jiarong (袁家融 1904—1996), studied in the United States and majored in geology at Columbia University.

In 1958, Yuan died of illness in Beijing, China.

References

1878 births
1958 deaths
19th-century Chinese people
20th-century Chinese people
Chinese people of Korean descent
Chinese princes
Crown princes
Central Research Institute of Culture and History
Empire of China (1915–1916)
Heirs apparent who never acceded
Children of national leaders of China